The Blue Bay LPGA is a women's professional golf tournament in China on the LPGA Tour. It debuted in October 2014 at Jian Lake Blue Bay Golf Course on Hainan Island.

Winners

* The 2014 tournament was reduced to 54 holes due to unplayable conditions stemming from heavy rain,and was held over to 27 October due to lack of daylight during the scheduled final round.

Tournament records

References

External links
Coverage on LPGA Tour's official site

Former LPGA Tour events
Golf tournaments in China
Sport in Hainan
Recurring sporting events established in 2014
Recurring sporting events disestablished in 2018
2014 establishments in China
2018 disestablishments in China